George Giatsis (born 22 June 1968) is an academic researcher and a  Greek volleyball and beach volleyball coach (Aris, P.A.O.K., Lamia, Filathlitikos). He has a doctorate in the kinesiology of volleyball and beach volleyball. The title of his thesis was "Biomechanical differences in elite beach-volleyball players in vertical jumps on rigid and sand surface". He also wrote a number of scientific articles concerning volleyball, beach volleyball and vertical jumps. He is an expert in kinesiology of the arm swing technique in spike attack in volleyball and beach volleyball. Giatsis played more than 200 tournaments in Greece and internationally. In 1998, he took ninth place in CEV finals at the European Championship in Rhodes. He also took 2nd place in Doha, Qatar in 2002.

References

External links 
 Official website Aristotle University of Thessaloniki, Department of Physical Education & Sport Science

George Giatsis at Volleybox

Volleyball coaches
Living people
1968 births
Men's beach volleyball players
Greek beach volleyball players